Before the Dawn is reggae and dancehall artist Buju Banton's tenth studio album. It was released on September 28, 2010. This album was recorded at the artist's own Gargamel Music studio in Kingston, Jamaica. The album was Buju's last release before he was found guilty of federal drug charges.

The album won a Grammy Award in the Best Reggae Album category in 2011.

Track listing
"Rasta Can't Go" – 4:31
"In the Air" – 3:35
"Do Good" – 6:59
"Battered & Bruised" – 4:08
"Bondage" – 5:15
"Struggle Together" – 4:32
"Life" – 5:03
"No Smoking at All" – 3:26
"Try Life" – 4:10
"Innocent" – 3:34

Charts

References

2010 albums
Buju Banton albums
Printworthy redirects